Veys may refer to:

People 
Marie Elisabeth Veys (born in 1981), Belgian judoka

Places

France 
Les Veys, old commune in Normandy

Iran 
Veys District, district of Khuzestan Province
Veys, capital of Veys District